Mike Elliott is a British Formula One aerodynamicist. He is currently the technical director at the Mercedes AMG Petronas Motorsport Formula One team.

Biography
Elliott started his career in motorsport in 2000 as an aerodynamicist for McLaren. In 2003, he then became a trackside aerodynamicist before progressing on to being the team leader for aerodynamic performance at McLaren in 2006. In 2008, he moved to the Renault F1 team to become the principal aerodynamicist, he stayed with the Enstone team until 2012 when he moved to Mercedes to become the head of aerodynamics. In 2017 he replaced Geoff Willis as technology director at Mercedes. In 2021 he succeeded James Allison as technical director at the team.

Career timeline
 Aerodynamicist – McLaren (2000-2003)
 Trackside aerodynamicist – McLaren (2003-2006)
 Team Leader aerodynamic performance – McLaren (2006-2008)
 Principle aerodynamicist – Renault F1 (2008-2011)
 Principle aerodynamicist – Lotus F1 (2012)
 Head of aerodynamics – Mercedes F1 (2012-2017)
 Technology director – Mercedes F1 (2017-2021)
 Technical director – Mercedes F1 (2021-)

References

1974 births
Living people
Formula One designers
Aerodynamicists
British motorsport designers
21st-century British engineers
Mercedes-Benz in Formula One